Sylvester Edward Paulus (March 12, 1899 – December 31, 1959) was an American football and basketball coach.

Hanover
Paulus was a 1920 graduate of Hanover College in Hanover, Indiana. He served as the school's head football coach (1919) and head basketball coach (1919–1920).

Daniel Baker and Stout Normal
Paulus served as the head football coach at Daniel Baker College in 1920 and the University of Wisconsin–Stout–then known as Stout Normal Institute–from 1928 to 1929. He also coach Stout's basketball team.

Later life and death
Until about 1945, Paulus operated a hotel in Bar Harbor, Michigan.  He subsequently ran a booking agency for speakers at high schools and colleges.  Paulus died on December 31, 1959, in Chicago, Illinois.

Head coaching record

Football

References

External links
 

1899 births
1959 deaths
Daniel Baker Hillbillies football coaches
Hanover Panthers football coaches
Hanover Panthers men's basketball coaches
Wisconsin–Stout Blue Devils football coaches
Wisconsin–Stout Blue Devils men's basketball coaches
High school basketball coaches in Arizona
High school football coaches in Arizona
Hanover College alumni
Sportspeople from Chicago